Mbu may refer to:

People

 Joe Mbu,  rugby league coach
 Joe Mbu (footballer), Scottish footballer
 Joey Mbu, American football player
 Joseph Mbu, Nigerian rugby union player 
 Matthew Mbu, Nigerian politician

Fish

 Mbu pufferfish, freshwater pufferfish

Other

 Macintosh Business Unit, Division of Microsoft
 Marble Blast Ultra, a video game for Xbox 360
 MRC Mitochondrial Biology Unit, a mitochondrial research centre in Cambridge
 Scotch MBU {Master Broadcast U-Matic}, a brand of U-Matic video tape.